"All Seats Taken" is the debut single of Australian actress and singer Bec Cartwright, taken from her first album, Bec Cartwright. The track peaked at number 10 on the Australian Singles Chart in November 2002. The song was originally penned for the female finalists of Popstars 3. However, because none of them won the series, it was given to Cartwright instead.

Music video
The music video was filmed in a former roller skating rink in Petersham, an Inner West suburb of Sydney. The location is now a mixed residential and commercial complex.

Track listing
Australian CD single
 "All Seats Taken"
 "All Seats Taken" (Fat Head remix)
 "All Seats Taken" (extended mix)
 "All Seats Taken" (karaoke)

Charts

Weekly charts

Year-end charts

Certification

References

2002 singles
2002 songs
Bec Hewitt songs
East West Records singles
Songs written by Anders Wikström (songwriter)
Songs written by Fredrik Thomander